Trinidad and Tobago competed at the 2022 Commonwealth Games at Birmingham, England from 28 July to 8 August 2022. It was the team's 19th appearance at the Games.

Jereem Richards and Michelle-Lee Ahye were the country's flagbearers during the opening ceremony.

Medalists

Competitors
The following is the list of number of competitors participating at the Games per sport/discipline.

Athletics

A squad of twenty-six athletes was officially selected as of 14 July 2022.

Men
Track and road events

Field events

Women
Track and road events

Field events

3x3 basketball

By virtue of its status as the top Commonwealth Caribbean nation in the FIBA 3x3 Federation Rankings for men (on 1 November 2021), Trinidad and Tobago qualified for the men's tournament.

Four players were announced on 14 July 2022.

Summary

Men's tournament

Roster
Adrian Joseph
Kemrick Julien
Steven Lewis
Sheldon Christian

Group play

Beach volleyball

As of 26 April 2022, Trinidad and Tobago qualified for the women's tournament. The intended Americas/Caribbean qualifier was abandoned, so the quota allocation was determined by their position among other nations from those regions in the women's FIVB Beach Volleyball World Rankings (for performances between 16 April 2018 and 31 March 2022).

Two players were selected as of 14 July 2022.

Women's tournament

Group B

Boxing

A squad of three boxers was officially selected as of 14 July 2022.

Cycling

A squad of six cyclists was officially selected as of 14 July 2022.

Road
Women

Track
Sprint

Keirin

Time trial

Points race

Scratch race

Gymnastics

One gymnast (Annalise Newman-Achee) was officially selected as of 14 July 2022.

Artistic
Women
Individual Qualification

Judo

A squad of four judoka was officially selected as of 14 July 2022.

Netball

By virtue of its position in the World Netball Rankings (as of 31 January 2022), Trinidad and Tobago qualified for the tournament.

Complete fixtures were announced in March 2022.

Summary

Roster
Twelve players were selected on 7 July 2022.

Shaquanda Greene-Noel (c)
Aniecia Baptiste
Jeresia McEchrane
Joelisa Cooper (vc)
Afeisha Noel
Tiana Dillon
Tahirah Hollingsworth
Tia Bruno
Janeisha Cassimy
Oprah Douglas
Faith Hagley
Shantel Seemungal	

Group play

Eleventh place match

Squash

A squad of two players was officially selected as of 14 July 2022.

Swimming

A squad of six swimmers was officially selected as of 14 July 2022.

Men

Women

Table tennis

A squad of three players was officially selected as of 14 July 2022.

Singles

Doubles

Triathlon

A squad of four triathletes was officially selected on 15 June 2022.

Individual

Mixed relay

See also
Trinidad and Tobago at the 2022 Winter Olympics

References

External links
Trinidad and Tobago Olympic Committee Official site

Nations at the 2022 Commonwealth Games
Trinidad and Tobago at the Commonwealth Games
2022 in Trinidad and Tobago sport